The Mixed 5 km Team Relay competition at the 2019 World Aquatics Championships was held on 18 July 2019.

Results
The race was started at 08:00.

References

Team
World Aquatics Championships